Brave Lifa (born 5 September 1995) is a Malawian swimmer. He competed in the men's 50 metre freestyle event at the 2016 Summer Olympics, where he ranked 83rd with a time of 28.54 seconds. He did not advance to the semifinals.

References

1995 births
Living people
Malawian male freestyle swimmers
Olympic swimmers of Malawi
Swimmers at the 2016 Summer Olympics
Place of birth missing (living people)